Kornchid Boonsathipakdee (born 11 July 1999), also known as Nine or Gao Qingchen is a Thai actor and singer of Chinese descent. He is best known for his role as Kit in 2 Moons 2. He is currently a member of the multi-national Chinese boy group INTO1, after finishing in fifth place in the reality survival show Produce Camp 2021.

Life and career

Early life and pre-debut 
Kornchid was born on July 11, 1999, in Bangkok, Thailand. He was a student at the Assumption University also known as ABAC, studying at the Faculty of Business Administration, being on the list of honors. In his student days he was on the swimming and volleyball team, as well as being good at archery. In addition to his native language, which is Thai, he also speaks English, as he learned it to get a scholarship. That is why he was a volunteer teacher and taught English to young people from remote areas of his country. He can also speak Japanese as he studied for 3 years and in 2020 he learned Chinese for 3 months, and then in 2021 he took a flight to China to participate in Produce Camp 2021.

In 2017, he auditioned for the show The band Thailand season 2 performing the song "All of Me" by John Legend.

2019–present: Acting debut, OXQ and INTO1 

Kornchid made his acting debut in 2019 with the main role of Kit in the BL drama 2 Moons 2.

He debuted on June 4, 2020, as a member of the Thai boys project group OXQ as the group's center, lead dancer, and main vocalist. He made up the majority of the main cast of the drama 2 Moons 2, a drama produced by his company Motive Village, which also served as the boy group's label.

In November of the same year, he revealed that he became an Insight Entertainment trainee, confirming his departure from Motive Village and the band.

In January 2021, he announced that he will not continue with his role in "2 Moons 3". 2 months later, the company confirmed that none of the original actors from the series would return to play the main characters again.

He also informed that he would become a contestant on the Chinese survival show Produce Camp 2021, while representing Insight Entertainment. He ranked in 5th place, confirming his debut as one of the members of INTO1.

Filmography

Television series

Television show

Music Videos

Discography

Endorsements

Brand Activity

Fanmeetings and public performances

Live Events

Magazine

Awards and nominations

Notes

References

External links 
 
 

Kornchid Boonsathitpakdee
Kornchid Boonsathitpakdee
Kornchid Boonsathitpakdee
1999 births
Living people
Kornchid Boonsathitpakdee
Kornchid Boonsathitpakdee
Kornchid Boonsathitpakdee
Produce 101 (Chinese TV series) contestants
Into1 members
Reality show winners
Kornchid Boonsathitpakdee